Queen's Square is an electoral constituency in the Belize District represented in the House of Representatives of the National Assembly of Belize since 2020 by Denise Barrow of the United Democratic Party. Her brother, former Prime Minister Dean Barrow, previously held the constituency from 1984 until he retired during the 2020 Belizean general election.

Profile

The Queen's Square constituency was one of 10 new seats created for the 1984 general election. It occupies a southern portion of central Belize City, bordering the Collet, Mesopotamia and Port Loyola constituencies. A UDP stronghold, Queen's Square is the only constituency in the Belize District which has never been won by the People's United Party.

Area Representatives

Elections

References

Political divisions in Belize
Queen's Square (Belize House constituency)
Belizean House constituencies established in 1984